The 2015 Red Bull Air Race of Budapest was the fourth round of the 2015 Red Bull Air Race World Championship season, the tenth season of the Red Bull Air Race World Championship. The event was held on the Danube river in Budapest, Hungary.

Austria's Hannes Arch took his second successive victory by 0.207 seconds ahead of championship leader Paul Bonhomme, with Martin Šonka completing the podium in third place. In the Challenger class, Daniel Ryfa took his second successive win by 0.227 seconds ahead of Mikaël Brageot, with Peter Podlunšek and Petr Kopfstein also finishing within a second of Ryfa.

Master Class

Qualification

Round of 14

 Pilot received 2 seconds in penalties
 Pilot advanced as they were the higher-placed in qualifying

Round of 8

 Pilot received 2 seconds in penalties

Final 4

Challenger Class

Results

Standings after the event

Master Class standings

Challenger Class standings

 Note: Only the top five positions are included for both sets of standings.

References

External links

|- style="text-align:center"
|width="35%"|Previous race:2015 Red Bull Air Race of Rovinj
|width="30%"|Red Bull Air Race2015 season
|width="35%"|Next race:2015 Red Bull Air Race of Ascot
|- style="text-align:center"
|width="35%"|Previous race:2009 Red Bull Air Race of Budapest
|width="30%"|Red Bull Air Race of Budapest
|width="35%"|Next race:2016 Red Bull Air Race of Budapest
|- style="text-align:center"

Budapest
Red Bull Air Race World Championship